Ranking Stone (born 14 January 1973) is a Puerto Rican reggaeton artist. He made four albums, Censurado being the most known. Censurado charted in the United States, reaching #36 on the Billboard Latin Albums chart and #4 on its Tropical Albums chart.

Discography

Studio albums
Atrevido (1994)
Different Styles (1995)
Censurado (2003)
Al Rescate (2006)

Singles

 Sigue Batiendo 2 (con Brewley MC) (1992)
 Pide Mas (1994)
Lirica Decente (1995)
A Dios Le Pido (1996)
Si Es Cuestión (1997)
Llego El Escuadron (1998)
En Panama (1999)
Que Melones (2000)
Yo Soy Un Bellako (2001)
El Lechero (2002)
Baila Conmigo (con Trebol Clan) (2003)
Dale Mai (con Cheka) (2003)
Tu Sabes (2004)
Vuelvo & Salgo (2005)
 Donde Estas? (con Juno) (2006)
 Princesa (2007)
Como Entender (con Jennifer Peña) (2008)
 A Romper La Disco (2009)
Ware Monton (2010)
Que Siga La Fiesta (con El Chicano) (2011)
Lobo De Amor (con El Chicano) (2012)
Enciende El Phillie (con Kris-D & El Trovon) (2013)
 Hasta Que Salga El Sol (2014)
Reggaeton The Movie (2015)
Mambo (2016)
Hello (con Alberto Stylee, Falo & Rey Pirin) (2017)
El Bam, Bam (2018)
Qué Baúl (2019)

References

Puerto Rican reggaeton musicians
Puerto Rican musicians
Living people
1973 births